The Four of Us is a 2021 German film directed by Florian Gottschick, written by Florian von Bornstädt and starring Jonas Nay, Nilam Farooq and Paula Kalenberg. The film was released by Netflix in October 2021. The original title is Du Sie Er & Wir ("you, her, him and us").

Plot
The Four of Us is a relationship drama involving two couples: the aspiring young journalist Janina (Nina) and her husband Ben, a struggling actor; and Janina's best friend Maria and Maria's boyfriend, the estate agent Nils. Four weeks previously, the four had agreed to a partner exchange, whereby Janina lived with Nils, and Maria with Ben, with an understanding that there should be no intimacy. The aim was that each should learn more about what they really want in a relationship. As the film opens, they gather at a holiday house by the beach on the North Sea to discuss their experiences. It soon becomes apparent that all four of them have broken the no-sex rule, and it appears that Ben and Maria are in love, and Janina is pregnant from Nils. Over the next two days they try to find a way of moving forward, other truths emerge, and it becomes clear that all of them have changed in their feelings and expectations of love.

Most of the film plays in the house and on the beach, and involves only the four main characters. Secondary characters appear only in the brief scenes in the city at the beginning and end of the film that show the protagonists in their everyday lives: Janina's colleague Anton and her boss Ann-Kathrin; Nils' clients, the family Bolschakow; an actress playing against Ben in a scene from a soap opera; and the staff at a clinic.

Production
The Four of Us was produced by Red Pony Pictures, a label of the Saxonia Media Filmproduktion. 
Filming took place from 25 November to 18 December 2020 in Tetenbüll (Schleswig-Holstein) and in Hamburg. 
The film was released on 15 October 2021 as a Netflix Original on the Netflix streaming service.

Cast 
 Nilam Farooq as Janina
 Paula Kalenberg as Maria
 Jonas Nay as Nils
 Louis Nitsche as Ben
 Tim Oliver Schultz as Anton
 Paula Paul as Ann-Kathrin
 Janina Elkin as Mrs. Bolschakow
 Emma Riegel as Larissa Bolschakow
 Nora Huetz as Actress
 Manuel Ossenkopf as Doctor's Assistant

References

External links 
 
 

2021 films
2020s German-language films
German romantic comedy-drama films
German-language Netflix original films
2020s German films